Muttart is a surname. Notable people with the surname include:

Ephraim Bell Muttart (1839–1912), Canadian physician and politician
Patrick Muttart (born 1972), Canadian political strategist and business executive